The Nurse Matilda books were written by the British  children's author Christianna Brand (1907–1988) and illustrated by her cousin, Edward Ardizzone.  The books are based on stories told to the cousins by their great-grandfather.

They concern a hideously ugly witch known as Nurse Matilda who has been highly recommended to Mr. and Mrs. Brown as a nursemaid by several agencies.  Nurse Matilda arrives at the household of the Brown family and becomes a nanny to the innumerable Brown children.  The Brown children are "exceedingly naughty" and frighten off many governesses in wonderfully mischievous ways – until Nurse Matilda comes.  She teaches the children to behave, and deals with the fearsome and pernickety Great Aunt Adelaide Stitch.  In the end the children become good and decent, and Nurse Matilda leaves to attend another family of naughty children.

In the sequels, the children revert to their wicked ways, and the distressed Mr. and Mrs. Brown have no other choice but to send for Nurse Matilda again.

In the second book, the children are sent to live with their domineering Great Aunt Adelaide in her London manor.  In the third and final book, they are whisked away to the hospital following a prank that has gone wrong.

Books
Nurse Matilda's first appearance in print was in an anthology of children's stories collected by Christianna Brand:

 Brand, Christianna (compiled by), Naughty Children (London: Victor Gollancz Limited, 1962), also illustrated by Edward Ardizzone

The three subsequent Nurse Matilda stories, all published by Brockhampton Press, were:
 Nurse Matilda (1964)
 Nurse Matilda Goes to Town (1967)
 Nurse Matilda Goes to Hospital (1974)
The three stories were also published by Bloomsbury in a 3 volume slipcased edition in 2005.

Film adaptations
The books were later adapted for the films Nanny McPhee (2005) and Nanny McPhee and the Big Bang (2010).  In the first motion picture there are only seven children, and Nurse Matilda is renamed Nanny McPhee – her first name is not mentioned.

The most significant departure from the books, however, is the absence of Mrs. Brown.  In Brand's stories, Mrs. Brown is alive and well, whereas in the first film she is dead, having fallen ill after the birth of the youngest child, Agatha.  Mr. Brown is being forced to marry the foul Selma Quickly, a garishly clothed, thrice-widowed gold-digger, whose character did not appear in the books.

The sequel Nanny McPhee and the Big Bang (2010) is loosely based on the trilogy of Nurse Matilda books.  The film does not closely follow the plot of the trilogy, but several individual scenes are derived from the three books.  Emma Thompson started to write the script, based on Brand's books, in the spring of 2007.

Although a third film was originally planned, as Emma Thompson stated previously in an interview on Friday Night with Jonathan Ross, the box office returns from the second film were determined to be too low to proceed with the third film.

References

1964 children's books
Book series introduced in 1964
Books featuring nurses
British children's novels
Novels about child care occupations
Novels by Christianna Brand
Fictional witches
Series of children's books
Witchcraft in written fiction